Sangharsh is a 1999 Indian Hindi-language psychological horror thriller film directed by Tanuja Chandra. It stars Akshay Kumar, Preity Zinta, and Ashutosh Rana. The film was said to be based on the 1991 film The Silence of The Lambs, but Chandra rejected this, claiming the film was based on a similar lost police case in India. The film opened to positive reviews, with critical acclaim for the performances by Kumar and Zinta, as well as Rana's villainous turn.

Plot
A series of child abductions and murders have left the police force perplexed and unable to solve the case. Hence the case is handed over to the CBI, who designate trainee Reet Oberoi to solve the case. After some investigation the evidence points towards Lajja Shankar Pandey, a religious fanatic who believes in the sacrifice of children to gain immortality. Pandey's erratic behaviour and Reet's traumas (as a child she witnesses her older brother Jassi, a terrorist, being gunned down by the police in their home) forces Reet to seek help from a prisoner, an unjustly implicated genius by the name Professor Aman Verma.

At first Aman is rude towards Reet and refuses to help her, but with some help she manages to sway him into helping her. The case gets even more tough as she finds out that the Home Minister's only child has been kidnapped by Pandey. Reet cannot handle the pressure alone due to her traumatic childhood and her phobias, she also faces opposition from the local police partly because of Verma's methods. As they begin to spend more time together, he helps her overcome her fears and both fall in love.

They eventually track down Pandey, who is about to begin the last sacrifice on the day of a solar eclipse (Soorya Grahan), which he believes will finally help him attain immortality. Aman and Reet eventually save the child, killing Pandey in the process. However Aman is fatally injured. Reet and Aman share a kiss before he dies in her arms. Reet is given a hero's welcome and she finds a new sense of life in herself.

Cast
 Akshay Kumar as Professor Aman Verma
Preity Zinta as CBI Officer Reet Oberoi
Alia Bhatt as younger Reet Oberoi
Ashutosh Rana as Lajja Shankar Pandey
Vishwajeet Pradhan as CBI officer, Reet's boss
Aman Verma as Amit Shandilya
Rajesh Prasher as Jassi
Madan Jain as ACP Pawar
Ninad Kamat

Music
The soundtrack was composed by Jatin–Lalit with lyrics authored by Sameer:

Reception
Bella Jaisinghani of The Indian Express wrote, "This crime thriller is value for money," noting the performances: "Akshay Kumar and Preity Zinta have done an impressive job as a criminal and a CBI officer". R. Vasudevan of Hindustan Times noted the performances, believing it could be Kumar's turning point and mentioning Zinta for playing a role "different from the typical Bollywood heroine who is just an appendage of the hero." Rediff.com's reviewer Sharmila Taliculam gave the film a positive review, but concluded, "Sangharsh may or may not do well at the turnstiles. If you are a Mahesh Bhatt fan, you may find it watchable. If you are not, give it a miss." India Today critic Madhu Jain highly praised the film's performance, noting Kumar for delivering "quite a performance", Zinta for bringing "intelligence to her role", and Rana for a performance that "remains searingly etched on the mind". An article published by The Tribune at the time of release hailed Zinta's performance as "an amazing act", calling Sangharsh "an intense film". Mukhtar Anjoom of Deccan Herald wrote a positive review, noting that in spite of its possible lack of originality, "the treatment of the characters is first-rate" and "the build-up to the impending scare is brilliant". He further described Rana's performance as "outstanding" and praised Chandra for "bringing out the best" out of Kumar and Zinta. In 2013, Subhash K. Jha described it as one of the "rare ones in which top actors … agreed to play secondary roles" to the leading lady.

Awards
 Filmfare Award for Best Performance in a Negative Role  - Ashutosh Rana
 Zee Cine Award for Best Performance in a Negative Role - Ashutosh Rana

References

External links 
 

1990s Hindi-language films
1990s psychological thriller films
1990s serial killer films
1990s vigilante films
1999 films
Films directed by Tanuja Chandra
Films scored by Jatin–Lalit
Indian psychological horror films
Indian psychological thriller films
Indian remakes of American films
Indian serial killer films
Indian vigilante films